To Sell a War is a documentary film, first aired in December 1992 as part of CBC programme The Fifth Estate. The programme was directed and produced by Neil Docherty.

It chronicles the Citizens for a Free Kuwait campaign efforts to spin public relations sentiment in the United States in favor of the Gulf War, focusing on the story of Nurse Nayirah, who was, in fact, Nayirah al-Sabah, the daughter of Kuwait's ambassador to the United States Saud Nasir Al-Sabah. Her infamous testimony about Iraqi soldiers removing babies from incubators, which was widely disseminated,  was a result of coaching by PR firm Hill & Knowlton.

Awards
1993 – American Film and Video Festival - Blue Ribbon
1993 – Canadian Association of Journalists Awards for Investigative Reporting - CAJ Award - Network Television Category
1993 – The New York Festivals - Bronze Medal
1992 – Columbus International Film and Video Festival - Chris Award
1992 – Columbus International Film and Video Festival - Bronze Plaque
1992 – International Emmy Awards - International Emmy Award Documentary
1992 – Yorkton Short Film/Video Festival - Golden Sheaf Award - Best Documentary

See also
 Atrocity propaganda

References

Gulf War films
Canadian documentary television films
1990s English-language films
1990s Canadian films